Claire Kersten (born 9 July 1989) is a New Zealand netball player who plays in the ANZ Premiership, playing for the Waikato Bay of Plenty Magic. Claire can play WD and C. In 2013, she made her ANZ Championship debut for the Central Pulse.

She was in the NZ U21 team in the 2009 World Youth Championships, where she won a silver medal.

References

1989 births
Living people
New Zealand netball players
Central Pulse players
ANZ Championship players
Netball players at the 2018 Commonwealth Games
New Zealand international netball players
Commonwealth Games competitors for New Zealand
Waikato Bay of Plenty Magic players
New Zealand international Fast5 players